The Delineator  was an American women's magazine of the late 19th and early 20th centuries, founded by the Butterick Publishing Company in 1869 under the name The Metropolitan Monthly. Its name was changed in 1875. The magazine was published on a monthly basis in New York City. In November 1926, under the editorship of Mrs. William Brown Meloney, it absorbed The Designer, founded in 1887 and published by the Standard Fashion Company, a Butterick subsidiary.

One of its managing editors was writer Theodore Dreiser, who worked with other members of the
staff such as Sarah Field Splint (later known for writing cookbooks ) and Arthur Sullivant Hoffman.  The novelist and short story writer, Honoré Willsie Morrow served as editor, 1914–19.

The Delineator featured the Butterick sewing patterns and provided an in-depth look at the fashion of the day. Butterick also produced quarterly catalogs of fashion patterns in the 1920s and early 1930s.

In addition to clothing patterns, the magazine published photos and drawings of embroidery and needlework that could be used to adorn both clothing and items for the home. It also included articles on all forms of home decor.  It also published fiction, including many short stories by L. Frank Baum. In the late 1920s, it featured covers by noted fashion artist Helen Dryden.

It ceased publication in 1937.

Further reading
Endres, Kathleen L. and Therese L. Lueck, eds. Women's Periodicals in the United States: Consumer Magazines. Westport, CT: Greenwood Press, 1995: 60.

Bland, Sidney R. "Shaping the Life of the New Woman: The Crusading Years of the "Delineator" ." American Periodicals. Columbus, OH: The Ohio State University Press, 2009: Vol

References

External links 

  Note-The color plates are often not scanned.
 Catalog record for online issues
 Online archive of cover images
 The Delineator (143 issues digitized) at Cornell University Library
 The Delineator (49 issues) Canadiana by CRKN
 The Delineator ( 39 issues) at The Internet Archive
 The Delineator (5 issues), part of "An Online Exhibition of Canadian Dress: The Confederation Era (1840–1890)" at the Canadian Museum of History | Musée Canadien de l'Histoire
 The Delineator at The Winterthur Library (not digitized)
 The Delineator at the Metropolitan Museum of Art (not digitized)
 The Delineator at the Modern Literature & Culture Research Centre at Ryerson University (not digitized)

Monthly magazines published in the United States
Defunct women's magazines published in the United States
Magazines disestablished in 1937
Magazines established in 1873
Magazines published in New York City
Women's fashion magazines
Fashion magazines published in the United States